is a former Japanese football player. She played for Japan national team.

Club career
Isaka was born in Saitama Prefecture on January 25, 1976. She joined L.League club Urawa Ladies in 1994. She was selected Best Young Player awards in 1994 season. In 1995, she moved to Prima Ham FC Kunoichi (later Iga FC Kunoichi). In 1999 season, she scored 21 goals and became top scorer and she was selected MVP awards. She was also selected Best Eleven 3 times (1999, 2000 and 2003).

National team career
On June 15, 1997, Isaka debuted for Japan national team against China. She played at 1998, 2002 Asian Games, 1999 and 2001 AFC Championship. She was also a member of Japan for 1999 World Cup. She played 46 games and scored 15 goals for Japan until 2002.

National team statistics

References

External links
 

1976 births
Living people
Association football people from Saitama Prefecture
Japanese women's footballers
Japan women's international footballers
Nadeshiko League players
Urawa Motobuto Ladies FC players
Iga FC Kunoichi players
1999 FIFA Women's World Cup players
Footballers at the 1998 Asian Games
Footballers at the 2002 Asian Games
Women's association football forwards
Asian Games bronze medalists for Japan
Asian Games medalists in football
Medalists at the 1998 Asian Games
Medalists at the 2002 Asian Games
Nadeshiko League MVPs